Blankenhain is a town in the Weimarer Land district, in Thuringia, Germany.

History
Until the Napoleonic Wars, Blankenhain had been a part of the Duchy of Saxe-Weimar. After the Fourth Coalition's defeat at Jena and Auerstedt, Napoleon attached the Lordship of Blankenhain to the Principality of Erfurt, directly subordinate to himself as an "imperial state domain", separate from the Confederation of the Rhine (nominally a French protectorate set up to replace the now-defunct Holy Roman Empire), which the surrounding Thuringian states had joined.

After the Congress of Vienna, Erfurt was restored to Prussia on 21 June 1815, becoming the capital of one of the three districts of the new Province of Saxony, but some southern and eastern parts of Erfurter lands joined Blankenhain in being transferred to the newly promoted Grand Duchy of Saxe-Weimar-Eisenach the following September.

Blankenhain remained within Saxe-Weimar-Eisenach through the era of the German Empire (1871–1918) and into the Weimar Republic until it merged with 7 of the 8 other Saxon duchies to form the Free State of Thuringia. After being controlled briefly by the United States, from July 1945, the state of Thuringia came under the Soviet occupation zone, and was expanded to include parts of Prussian Saxony, including Erfurt, which became the new capital of Thuringia. The State of Thuringia was restored with slightly altered borders during German reunification in 1990.

Sons and daughters of the city 

 Otto Hammann (1852-1928), jurist
 Jörg Schneider (born 1948), paleontologist
 Christina Grosse (born 1970),  actress

People who are connected to Blankenhain 

 Johann Christoph Bach (1689-1740), organist, cousin of Johann Sebastian Bach
 Max Burchartz (1887-1961), graphican and painter, lived for a long time in Blankenhain
 Wilhelm Hegeler (1870-1943), writer, lived for several years in Blankenhain
 Max Oehler (1881-1943), painter, had a garden in Blankenhain, painted the city and its surroundings

References

External links
 
 
  Wikisource has texts related to Blankenhain:
 "" ["The Gallows-tree of Blankenhain"] from  [The Folklore of the Kingdom of Saxony] by Johann Georg Theodor Grässe

Weimarer Land
Grand Duchy of Saxe-Weimar-Eisenach